Pango in computing is a library for rendering internationalized texts.

Pango may also refer to:
 Pango, an Israeli car parking payment company that created the Pango Mobile Parking App
 PANGO, party-affiliated non-governmental organization
 Pango, a clone of the 1982 Pengo video game
 Pango Rhum, a brand of rum from Rhum Barbancourt
 Pango, a penguin-like monster from the mobile game My Singing Monsters
 Pango, an alternate Spanish spelling of Bangka (boat), traditional Filipino outrigger canoes
 Pango, Vanuatu, a village in Vanuatu

See also
 Pago Pago (pronounced "pango pango"), the de facto capital of American Samoa
 Pangolin, a scaly anteater somewhat resembling a large armadillo
 Phylogenetic Assignment of Named Global Outbreak Lineages (PANGOLIN), a software tool to implement the PANGO nomenclature